Alan Ian Percy, 8th Duke of Northumberland,  (17 April 1880 – 23 August 1930) was a British peer, army officer, and newspaper proprietor.

Military career
Percy was a second lieutenant of the 2nd Volunteer Battalion the Queen's (Royal West Surrey Regiment), when he was admitted as a second lieutenant in the Grenadier Guards on 24 January 1900. He was part of a detachment sent to South Africa in March 1900 to reinforce the 3rd battalion during the Second Boer War, and served with his regiment there until the war ended. For his service, he received the Queen's South Africa Medal. Following the end of the war, he returned to the United Kingdom in August 1902. During his time as ADC in Canada, he undertook a wager to walk 111 miles from one city to another in three days—despite blizzards and heavy snowfall, he completed the challenge and won the wager. During the First World War he served with the Grenadier Guards, working with the Intelligence Department to provide eyewitness accounts of battles and the front line. His brother Lord William Percy also served during the war; wounded in 1915, he spent the remainder of the war working as a military attorney. He was made a Chevalier of the Légion d'honneur. On 1 October 1918 he was appointed Honorary Colonel of the 3rd (Reserve) Battalion, Queen's (Royal West Surrey Regiment).

Political activities
Politically Percy was a Tory diehard. He was a staunch supporter of the House of Lords. He wrote for the National Review on military matters.

From 1921, he funded the Boswell Publishing Company, and then in 1922 until his death, the Patriot, a radical right-wing weekly which published articles by Nesta Webster and promulgated a mix of anti-communism and anti-semitism.

In 1924, he acquired an interest in The Morning Post.

Other activities
The Duke was appointed Lord Lieutenant of Northumberland. For one year before his death, he served as Chancellor of the University of Durham, a role his father had also held. His father, the 7th Duke, was an alderman on the Middlesex County Council up to his death. In July 1918, he was chosen to fill the vacancy on the council in his father's place.

Family
Percy was the son of Henry Percy, 7th Duke of Northumberland, and Lady Edith Campbell.

On 18 October 1911, Percy married Lady Helen Magdalan Gordon-Lennox (daughter of Charles Gordon-Lennox, 7th Duke of Richmond). They had six children:

Henry George Alan Percy, 9th Duke of Northumberland (15 July 1912, killed in action 21 May 1940)
Hugh Algernon Percy, 10th Duke of Northumberland (6 April 1914, died 11 October 1988); he married Lady Elizabeth Montagu Douglas Scott on 12 June 1946. They have seven children. 
Lady Elizabeth Ivy Percy (25 May 1916 – 16 September 2008); she married Douglas Douglas-Hamilton, 14th Duke of Hamilton on 2 December 1937. They have five children.
Lady Diana Evelyn Percy (23 November 1917 – 16 June 1978); she married John Egerton, 6th Duke of Sutherland on 29 April 1939. They had no children.
Lord Richard Charles Percy (11 February 1921 – 20 December 1989). Educated at Eton College and Christ Church, Oxford. Joined the Grenadier Guards in 1941, serving with the Regiment's 1st Battalion in the Guards Armoured Division in North West Europe until retiring with the rank of Major in 1946; joined the Territorial Army regiment, the Northumberland Hussars in 1947 (Lieutenant-Colonel commanding 1958–1961). He was a lecturer in Zoology at Newcastle University for 36 years. He married Sarah Jane Elizabeth Norton (1937–1978), daughter of Petre Norton of The Manor House, Whalton, on 10 September 1966. They had two children:
Algernon Alan Percy (17 March 1969)
Josceline Richard Percy (2 June 1971)
Lord Richard Charles Percy married secondly Hon. Clayre Campbell in 1979.
Lord Geoffrey William Percy (8 July 1925 – 4 December 1984); he married Mary Elizabeth Lea on 27 May 1955. They had one daughter: 
Diana Ruth Percy (22 November 1956)

The 8th Duke died on 23 August 1930 and was buried in the Northumberland Vault, within Westminster Abbey. He was succeeded in the dukedom and his other titles by his eldest son, George.

Works
 A Year Ago: Eye-witness's Narrative of the War from March 30th to July 18th, 1915, with E. D. Swinton, Longmans, Green & Co., 1916.
 "The Realities of the Situation," The Patriot, Vol. I, No. 1, 9 February 1922.
 First Jewish Bid For World Power, Reprinted from the Patriot, January, 1930.
 The Shadow on the Moor, 1930
"La Salamandre" The story of a vivandière 1934

Other
 W. H. Mallock, [https://www.europeana.eu/portal/record/9200143/CD03D1B86027E3A5A7E3F1D328B375EC3836C4D8.html?start=2&query=william+h.+mallock&startPage=1&rows=24 Democracy; being an Abridged Edition of 'The Limits of Pure Democracy'''], with an introduction by the Duke of Northumberland, Chapman & Hall, Ltd., 1924.

References

Further reading
 Ruotsila, Markku (2005). "The Catholic Apostolic Church in British Politics," Journal of Ecclesiastical History'', Vol. LVI (1), pp. 75–91.

External links

Alnwick Castle website

1880 births
1930 deaths
Military personnel from London
Chancellors of Durham University
Commanders of the Order of the British Empire
308
Grenadier Guards officers
Knights of the Garter
Lord-Lieutenants of Northumberland
Members of the Royal Victorian Order
British Army personnel of World War I
Alan Percy, 8th Duke of Northumberland
British Army personnel of the Mahdist War
British Army personnel of the Second Boer War
Burials at Westminster Abbey
British landowners
Conservative Party (UK) politicians
Members of Middlesex County Council
English people of Scottish descent
Antisemitism in England
20th-century British businesspeople
Surtees Society